WAMH (89.3 FM) is a radio station occasionally broadcasting an alternative rock format. It is licensed to Amherst, Massachusetts, United States, and the station is owned by Amherst College.  Programming has included independent artists, news, college sports, and live local music. Since September 2015, when the college is in session the station splits broadcast time between student programming from 4:00 p.m. to 2:00 a.m. and a relay of NEPR News Network broadcasting at other hours.

The station is federally licensed (authorized by the FCC) and non-commercial, and is under the supervision of the Amherst College Board of Trustees.

WAMH broadcasts from an antenna adjacent to the WFCR tower on Mount Lincoln in Pelham, Massachusetts. Nielsen Broadcast Data Systems ratings as of January 2018 found that over 3,500 listeners tune in to WAMH during the 10 hours of student programming each day.

See also
 WFCR

References

External links
 
 

1955 establishments in Massachusetts
Amherst College
Amherst, Massachusetts
AMH
Mass media in Hampshire County, Massachusetts
Radio stations established in 1955